České Budějovice Airport (ICAO: LKCS, IATA: JCL) is a public domestic and non-public international airport operated by South Bohemian Airport České Budějovice a.s., owned by the South Bohemian Region and the city of České Budějovice. It is 6 km from the centre of České Budějovice, in the direction of Český Krumlov. Modernization to the public international airport should be completed in late 2020.

The company South Bohemian Airport České Budějovice holds the license for non-public international traffic. It is authorized to receive and dispatch medium-sized aircraft up to a wingspan of 36 meters. Due to lack of equipment, the airport cannot accept flights in bad weather; aircraft can land only in daylight and in good visibility (VFR). In addition, flights requiring customs clearance and the presence of customs and immigration services must register 24 hours in advance. At present, the airport is most used for sports and limited commercial flights; regular airport clients are firms with business interests in southern Bohemia.

History 

In 1932, the construction of the airport for the needs of the Aeroclub České Budějovice and the Czechoslovak Air Force began; ceremonial commissioning was on 27 June 1937. During the Nazi occupation, the airport was a backup and training base of the German Luftwaffe. After the liberation, the Czechoslovak Army took over the airport. Between 1950 and 1952, the airport was completely modernized, after which the Aeroklub České Budějovice was no longer permitted to operate at the airport and moved to Hosín airport.

Between 1952 and 31 December 1994, the 1st Air Force Regiment "Zvolenský" was based at the local airport. The presence of the Czechoslovak Air Force was gradually reduced during the 1990s, culminating in the closure of the military base in 2005.

Modernisation 

The thorough modernization and reconstruction of the airport is currently under way, in several phases, to bring it to a similar standard to other regional airports in the Czech Republic. Upon completion, České Budějovice Airport will be suitable for mid-size transportation aircraft, including charter and business flights. The investor in this project is the owner of the complex, the South Bohemian Region.

The first phase was completed in June 2015, including the repair of the runway and taxiways, the reinforcement of the runway surface and the addition of new navigatation aids for conventional airplanes. In addition, an in-house communications, engineering networks and a security center were built.

Phase II comprises the construction of a new terminal, expanding aircraft stands, improving access roads and car parks for passengers, and providing public lighting. Once the terminal building is completed, there will be a certification process, lasting six to twelve months, allowing international traffic. The airport will be a fully certified airport for charter, tourist, business, freight and domestic transportation, with aircraft such as the Boeing 737 and Airbus A320 permitted to land.

Construction of the new terminal started in December 2017, full operation is planned at the end of 2020.

Airlines and destinations
The following airlines operate regular scheduled and charter flights at České Budějovice Airport:

References

External links

 Official website
 
 

Airports in the Czech Republic
Buildings and structures in České Budějovice
Buildings and structures in the South Bohemian Region
1937 establishments in Czechoslovakia
Airports established in 1937
20th-century architecture in the Czech Republic